Cameron Phillip Heyward (born May 6, 1989) is an American football defensive tackle for the Pittsburgh Steelers of the National Football League (NFL). He was drafted by the Steelers in the first round of the 2011 NFL Draft. He played college football at Ohio State.
Heyward is the son of Pro Bowl NFL player Craig Heyward.

High school career
Heyward attended Peachtree Ridge High School in Suwanee, Georgia, where he played for the Peachtree Ridge Lions high school football team. He was the 2006 Georgia Class 5A Defensive Player of the Year. The team tied for the Georgia Class 5A State Championship that same year. He totaled over 100 tackles and 16 sacks as a Senior. He was considered the 7th best football player in Georgia, and the 13th best defensive tackle in the nation by Scout.com. He benched 335 pounds and squatted 510 pounds, and was considered a scholar athlete at Peachtree Ridge High School with a GPA of 3.2.

College career
As a true freshman in 2007, Heyward was named a freshman All-American by Sporting News, Rivals.com and Scout.com after recording 30 tackles, 9 tackles for loss, 2 sacks, and 2 passes broken up.  The Ohio State Buckeyes went to the BCS National Championships with Heyward as a freshman, losing to Louisiana State University, 38–24.

As a sophomore in 2008, he recorded 36 tackles and three sacks.  The Buckeyes made it to another bowl game in the 2009 Fiesta Bowl against Texas, losing 24–21.

As a junior, in 2009, he had 10 tackles for loss and 6.5 sacks, leading the Ohio State Buckeyes to the Rose Bowl, in which the Buckeyes won 26–17 against Oregon.  Following his junior season, Heyward decided against declaring for the NFL Draft,  instead returning for his senior season with the Buckeyes.

Heyward amassed 48 total tackles and 3.5 sacks in his senior season, returning an interception for a career high 80 yards against Miami. He led the Buckeyes to a berth in the Allstate 2011 Sugar Bowl, beating the Arkansas Razorbacks 31–26.

College statistics

Heyward finished his career at Ohio State with 163 tackles, 37.5 tackles for loss, 15.5 sacks.

Professional career
Coming out of Ohio State, Heyward was projected to be selected in the first round by the majority of analysts and scouts. Sports Illustrated ranked him the 16th best prospect and the fifth best defensive end prior to the NFL Combine. Although he attended the NFL Combine, he was only able to perform the vertical after coming off elbow surgery in January. After the combine, he was projected to be selected in the first or second rounds because of the large number of defensive end prospects that were graded highly. At the conclusion of the combine, he was ranked the eighth best defensive end and the 26th best prospect by NFLDraftScout.com. NFL Network analyst Mike Mayock ranked him the seventh best defensive end and 27th best prospect in the 2011 NFL Draft.

2011
The Pittsburgh Steelers selected Heyward in the first round (31st overall) of the 2011 NFL Draft. He was the seventh defensive end selected in 2011.

On July 29, 2011, the Pittsburgh Steelers signed Heyward to a four-year, $6.70 million contract that included $5.41 million guaranteed and a signing bonus of $3.37 million.

He entered training camp competing with veterans Brett Keisel, Aaron Smith, and Ziggy Hood for a starting defensive end position. Going into the regular season, he was named the backup strong side defensive end behind Brett Kiesel. After wearing jersey number 95 during the pre-season of his rookie campaign, Heyward switched to No. 97 after Jason Worilds opted to switch to No. 93.

He made his professional regular season debut in the Pittsburgh Steelers season-opener against the Baltimore Ravens and made one solo tackle as the Ravens routed the Steelers 35–7. On October 9, 2011, Heyward recorded his first career sack on Tennessee Titans quarterback Matt Hasselbeck, while also making two solo tackles in a 38–17 victory. During a Week 16 matchup against the St. Louis Rams, he made a season-high three solo tackles in a 27–0 victory.

He finished the season with 11 combined tackles, a sack, a forced fumble, a pass deflection, and he blocked a field goal in 16 games. The Pittsburgh Steelers finished second in the AFC North with a 12–4 record and received a playoff berth.

On January 8, 2012, Heyward appeared in his first career postseason games and made four combined tackles in a 29–23 overtime loss to the Denver Broncos.

2012

He entered training camp competing with Ziggy Hood for the vacant weakside defensive end position. Hood won the job, making Heyward the backup for the season.

He played in the Pittsburgh Steelers' season-opener against the Denver Broncos and made three combined tackles in the 31–19 loss. The next week, Heyward recorded a solo tackle and made his first sack of the season on Mark Sanchez as the Steelers routed the New York Jets 27–10. On December 30, 2012, he collected a season-high four combined tackles and was credited with half a sack in Thad Lewis during a 24–10 win over the Cleveland Browns. He was used as a rotational defensive end throughout the season and had 20 combined tackles and 1.5 sacks.

2013
Heyward began the regular season as the backup strongside defensive end behind Brett Keisel. He appeared in the Pittsburgh Steeler's season-opener and made one solo tackle in a 16–9 loss to the Tennessee Titans. On September 22, 2013, he earned his first career start in place of weakside defensive end Ziggy Hood and finished the 40–23 loss to the Chicago Bears with one solo tackle. Heyward earned his second start during a Week 6 matchup against the New York Jets and recorded two combined tackles in a 19–6 victory. He remained the starting weakside defensive end for the rest of the season. On November 3, 2013, he made five combined tackles and earned his first sack of the season on Tom Brady, as the New England Patriots routed the Steelers 55–31. In Week 14, he made a season-high ten combined tackles, a sack, and a pass deflection during a 34–28 loss to the Miami Dolphins. He finished the season with 59 combined tackles (35 solo), seven pass deflections, five sacks, two tackles for loss, and a fumble recovery in 16 games and 13 starts. He finished second on the team (first among defensive linemen) with five sacks and led the team with 31 quarterback pressures. Pro Football Focus ranked him 19th among all the qualified defensive ends in 2013.

2014
On April 22, 2014, the Pittsburgh Steelers exercised a fifth-year option on his rookie contract paying him $6.96M in 2015.

Throughout training camp he competed with Brett Keisel, Stephon Tuitt, and Cam Thomas to be a starting defensive end. Defensive coordinator Dick Lebeau named him the starting weak side defensive end, opposite Cam Thomas, to begin the regular season.

He started the Pittsburgh Steelers season-opener against the Cleveland Browns and made four combined tackles and sacked Brian Hoyer in a 30–27 victory. The following game, he recorded a season-high seven combined tackles as the Baltimore Ravens defeated the Steelers 26–6. On October 3, 2014, Heyward was fined $22,050 by the NFL for using abusive language towards an official during Week 4 loss to the Tampa Bay Buccaneers. On December 21, 2014, Heyward recorded four combined tackles and was credited 1.5 sacks on Alex Smith during a 20–12 victory over the Kansas City Chiefs. The following game, he made a season-high six solo tackles, an assisted tackle, and sacked Andy Dalton in a 27–17 win. He finished the season with 53 combined tackles (33 solo), a career-high 7.5 sacks, and four pass deflections in 16 games and 16 starts. Heyward played in 64 consecutive games during his first four seasons. He received the sixth highest overall grade among all qualified defensive ends from Pro Football Focus in 2014.

The Pittsburgh Steelers finished first in the AFC North with an 11–5 record in 2014. On January 3, 2015, Heyward made two combined tackles in a 30–17 loss to the Baltimore Ravens in the AFC Wildcard game.

2015
On July 16, 2015, the Pittsburgh Steelers signed Heyward to a six-year, $59.25 million extension that includes $15 million guaranteed and a signing bonus of $12 million.

Heyward began the season as the de facto left defensive end, along with Stephon Tuitt. He started the season-opener against the New England Patriots and recorded four combined tackles in a 28–21 loss. The next week, he made five solo tackles and sacked Colin Kaepernick as the Steelers routed the San Francisco 49ers 43–18. On November 8, 2015, Heyward racked up a season-high eight combined tackles in a 38–35 victory over the Oakland Raiders.

Heyward finished the season with 54 combined tackles (39 solo), seven sacks, and two pass deflections in 16 games and 16 starts. The Pittsburgh Steelers finished second in the AFC North with a 10–6 record. On January 9, 2016, he made a solo tackle and sacked A. J. McCarron during an 18–16 victory over the Cincinnati Bengals. The following game, the Pittsburgh Steelers lost 23–16 to the eventual Super Bowl 50 Champions, the Denver Broncos. Heyward was ranked 88th on the NFL Top 100 Players of 2016.

2016
Heyward started at defensive end in the Pittsburgh Steelers' season-opener against the Washington Redskins and collected two combined tackles in a 38–16 victory. On October 2, 2016, Heyward recorded a season-high seven solo tackles, two pass deflections, and sacked Alex Smith a career-high three times, as the Pittsburgh Steelers routed the Kansas City Chiefs 43–14. During Week 6, he missed the first game of his career with a hamstring injury. His streak ended at 85 consecutive games and 49 consecutive starts. On November 13, 2016, Heyward suffered a torn pectoral muscle during the Steelers loss to the Dallas Cowboys where he recorded two solo tackles. He announced two days later that he would be placed on injured reserve and would miss the rest of the season. He finished the season with 22 combined tackles (17 solo), three sacks, and four pass deflections.

2017
In Week 4, Heyward recorded two sacks and a fumble recovery in a 26–9 win over the Baltimore Ravens, earning him AFC Defensive Player of the Week. On November 27, 2017, Heyward recorded a season-high six combined tackles and had two sacks on quarterback Brett Hundley in the Steelers' 31–28 victory against the Green Bay Packers in Week 12. His performance earned him his second AFC Defensive Player of the Week honors of the season. After the season, he was named to the First-team All-Pro team. Head coach Mike Tomlin elected to rest Heyward during a Week 17 win against the Cleveland Browns as the Steelers had already clinched a playoff berth and first round bye. Heyward finished the season with 45 combined tackles (30 solo), a career-high 12 sacks, and three pass deflections in 15 games and 15 starts. Pro Football Focus gave him an overall grade of 88.9, which ranked him tenth among all qualified interior defensive linemen in 2017. He was also ranked 48th by his peers on the NFL Top 100 Players of 2018.

2018
In Week 5 against the Atlanta Falcons, Heyward recorded 1.5 sacks and 1 tackle for loss in a 41-17 blowout win. 
In week 10 against the Carolina Panthers, Heyward recorded 2 sacks as the Steelers won 52–21.
Heyward finished the season with 51 tackles, 8 sacks, 3 passes defended, 1 forced fumble, and 1 fumble recovery.  
He received an overall grade of 84.9 from Pro Football Focus in 2018, which ranked as the 16th highest grade among all qualifying interior defenders.

2019

In Week 4 against the Cincinnati Bengals, Heyward recorded 2.5 sacks and a forced fumble on Andy Dalton in the 27–3 win. He was named First-team All-Pro for the second time in his career on January 3, 2020.

2020
On September 6, 2020, Heyward signed a four-year, $65.6 million contract extension with the Steelers.
In Week 1 against the New York Giants on Monday Night Football, Heyward recorded his first career interception off a pass thrown by Daniel Jones during the 26–16 win.
In Week 5 against the Philadelphia Eagles, Heyward recorded his first full sack of the season on Carson Wentz during the 38–29 win.

2022
In Week 16, Heyward had seven tackles, two sacks, and three tackles for loss in a 13-10 win over the Raiders, earning AFC Defensive Player of the Week.

NFL career statistics

Personal life
Heyward was born in Pittsburgh, Pennsylvania. His late father Craig "Ironhead" Heyward was a former NFL fullback. His father died from cancer, and Cameron was fined by the NFL for uniform violations when he displayed his father's nickname in an eye black message during the NFL's 2015 Breast Cancer Awareness campaign. Cameron stated that being part of the NFL was a blessing and he wanted to honor his dad and raise cancer awareness.

During Heyward's freshman year at Ohio State University, he began dating Allie Schwarzwalder and proposed to her on New Year's Eve 2012 at Savoy. On May 11, 2013, they were married at Westin Convention Center at the Pittsburgh Hotel in Pittsburgh, Pennsylvania.

Heyward has three brothers. His youngest brother Connor played as a tight end for Michigan State. On April 30, 2022, the Pittsburgh Steelers drafted Connor as a tight end in the sixth round of the 2022 NFL draft.

References

External links
 
  
 

1989 births
Living people
People from Suwanee, Georgia
Sportspeople from the Atlanta metropolitan area
Players of American football from Georgia (U.S. state)
American football defensive ends
American football defensive tackles
Ohio State Buckeyes football players
Pittsburgh Steelers players
American Conference Pro Bowl players